Tiep or thieb is a traditional dish from Senegambia that is also consumed in Guinea Bissau, Guinea, Mali and Mauritania. It is the national dish in Senegal. The version of tiep called thieboudienne or chebu jen is prepared with fish, rice and tomato sauce cooked in one pot. There are also tiep yappa (with meat) and tiep ganaar (with chicken). Additional ingredients often include onions, carrots, cabbage, cassava, hot pepper, lime and peanut oil, and stock cubes.

Historically, tiep is commonly attributed to the city of Saint-Louis, in the nineteenth century. The name of the dish comes from Wolof words meaning 'rice' and 'fish'. It is served on large trays with the rice on the bottom and the fish, usually white grouper (Epinephelus aeneus), and the vegetables, many of them whole, placed in the center. 

Traditionally it is eaten in a large communal dish with the hand. It is also the symbol of Senegalese terranga (hospitality): family, visiting friends and guests gather around a single dish (called a bolus) from which everyone eats using a spoon (couddou Pulaar) or a piece of bread.

The popular West African dish known as jollof is thought to have originated from the thieboudienne, but is usually made with meat rather than fish, and the rice is mixed into the other ingredients.

The Gullah dish red rice resembles thieboudienne, suggesting a creolization of foodways from West Africa in the New World by enslaved Africans and their descendants. Like thieboudienne, there are regional variations of red rice throughout the Gullah/Geechee Cultural Heritage Corridor, including Savannah red rice and Charleston red rice.

Recipe 
It is a preparation of fresh or dried fish, and rice (rice Wolof), cooked with vegetables (such as cassava, pumpkin, cabbage, carrot, turnip, or eggplant), parsley, tomato paste, peppers, garlic and onions.  Originally made with fish, it is nowadays frequent to see it served with beef or even chicken.

Variations

By country 
Originally from Senegambia, the traditional recipe includes fish, rice, tomato and onions. However, tiep is commonly consumed in several countries in West Africa. Depending on the country, the recipe and the ingredients change—even the method of cooking can differ. In Mali, tiep is known as tieb, a dish consisting of chicken, rice and vegetables such as a tomato and onion base. It is a popular dish especially in Nigeria and Ghana. In Cameroon and Ivory Coast the dish is called riz gras. The components are similar to the original recipe's ingredients with the inclusion of tomatoes, rice and onions.

By ethnicity 
Senegal's distinctive ethnic groups have their own variations on cuisine and eating habits, influenced either by proximity to the ocean or the traditions of nomadism and cattle raising. For instance, people from southern Senegal usually also add some kouthia, while people from Dakar and Saint-Louis will use some soul (Wolof).

Other renderings
Other renderings of the name include: ceebu jen, cee bu jen, ceeb u jen, thebouidienne, theibou dienn, thiebou dienn, thiebou dinne, thiébou dieune, tíe biou dienne, thieb-ou-djien, thiebu djen or riz au poisson.

See also

 Couscous
Cuisine of Senegal
 Jollof rice
 Paprykarz szczeciński
 List of stews
 List of African dishes

References

Further reading 
 Senegal Travel Guide, World Travel Guide
 agricultural situation country report, USDA Foreign Agricultural Service,Mbalo Ndiaye,2007
 Food and daily life, Our Africa
 Duffy, Megan, "Ceeb ak Jën: Deconstructing Senegal’s National Plate in Search of Cultural Values" (2009). Independent Study Project (ISP) Collection. Paper 669.

Senegalese cuisine
Mauritanian cuisine
Malian cuisine
Nigerian cuisine
Guinean cuisine
Gambian cuisine
Cameroonian cuisine
Fish dishes
Seafood and rice dishes